Sawangsri is a surname. Notable people with the surname include:

Pradit Sawangsri (born 1978), Thai footballer 
Rungroj Sawangsri (born 1981), Thai footballer

Thai-language surnames